Gyrinops walla is a species of plant in the family Thymelaeaceae. It was described by Joseph Gaertner. The tree grows up to 15 m high. Its bark is thin and brownish-grey color. Leaves are 1–6 mm long and yellowish-white flower's pedicels are 3–4 mm long.

Gyrinops walla is found in wet zone of Sri Lanka and very rarely in southwest India. It is harvested for agarwood and agarwood resin. The tree has commercial value that resulted to smuggling. In Sri Lanka, it is known as "Walla patta". Due to the demand of the tree, Sadaharitha Plantations Limited released a study on growing Gyrinops walla in home gardens. Some organizations conducted the research with the support of the Sri Lankan government.

Gyrinops walla has been assessed as vulnerable on the IUCN Red List, due to its harvesting for agarwood. The species does occur in one protected area of Sri Lanka: Sinharaja Forest Reserve.

References

Thymelaeoideae
Flora of India (region)
Flora of Sri Lanka